The North to Shore Festival (aka North to Shore or N2S) is an upcoming music, comedy, film and technology festival in New Jersey. The event will be hosted by three New Jersey cities: Atlantic City (June 7–11), Asbury Park (June 14–18) and Newark (June 21–25). The North to Shore Festival is produced by, among others, the New Jersey Performing Arts Center,  SJ Presents, Madison Marquette, Live Nation Entertainment, Platinum Productions and Absolutely Live!

In announcing the festival, Governor Phil Murphy stated that the event was inspired by SXSW in Texas and designed to showcase the vibrant arts scene and inclusive cultural environment in New Jersey in particular.

As of March 2023, the festival planning process is still in progress, and organizers are asking local creators to submit ideas for events. The festival seeks "local producers or presenters of music,
comedy, dance, theater or visual art in Atlantic City, Asbury Park or Newark." Winners will be awarded stipends of up to $5,000 to execute their concepts.

2023 

The announced 2023 lineup includes:

Music 
 Halsey
 The B52s
 Demi Lovato
 Natalie Merchant
 MONSTA X
 Alanis Morissette with special guest Aimee Mann
 Santana

Additional acts include Anthony Krizan (formerly of Spin Doctors), Brian Fallon of Gaslight Anthem, Gavin DeGraw, Jay Wheeler, Low Cut Connie, Marisa Monte, Remember Jones, The Smithereens and Southside Johnny.

A tribute concert in honor of the music and life of Clarence Clemons will also be held at N2S.

Comedy 
 Bill Burr
 Stephen Colbert
 Jackie Fabulous
 Jim Gaffigan
 Jess Hilarious
 Ross Mathews
 NeNe Leakes
 Loni Love
 B. Simone

Film, technology and other arts 

Investor Daymond John of Shark Tank will be speaking at the festival. The annual Newark International Film Festival will take place during N2S as well.

The Newark International Film Festival will be hosting  a "From Hip Hop to Hollywood" conversation at N2S with Newark councilman and Lords of the Underground alum Dupré "DoItAll" Kelly,  speaking with Redman, Ludacris and Lady London.

References

Rock festivals in the United States
Pop festivals
Comedy festivals
Music festivals in New Jersey
Asbury Park, New Jersey
Festivals
Arts festivals in the United States
Comedy festivals in the United States
United